Zebra is a routing software package that provides TCP/IP based routing services with routing protocols support such as RIP, OSPF and BGP. Zebra also supports special BGP Route Reflector and Route Server behavior. In addition to traditional IPv4 routing protocols, Zebra also supports IPv6 routing protocols. With SNMP daemon which supports SMUX protocol, Zebra provides routing protocol management information bases.

Zebra uses an advanced software architecture to provide a high quality, multi server routing engine. Zebra has an interactive user interface for each routing protocol and supports common client commands. Due to this design, new protocol daemons can be easily added. Zebra library can also be used as a program's client user interface.

Zebra is distributed under the GNU General Public License.

Background
The idea for Zebra originally came from Kunihiro Ishiguro, after he realized the need for quality routing software. While working at an ISP joint venture between British Telecom and Marubeni, Ishiguro encountered venture capitalist Yoshinari Yoshikawa.

Yoshinari Yoshikawa shared Ishiguro's vision for a new routing engine and they combined resources to create the world's first routing engine software. The resulting entity, known as the Zebra Project, was started in 1996.

Present
Ishiguro and Yoshikawa lead the IP Infusion company and market a commercial version of Zebra, known as "ZebOS". This ZebOS is being used in networking products, such as FortiOS and the Citrix NetScaler.

Future
The official website states that "Zebra has been decommissioned".

Since its last release (version 0.95) in 2005-09-08, development of Zebra appears to have stopped. A new project has emerged as the unofficial successor of Zebra: Quagga.
Worldwide, many Linux/BSD based BGP-routers which were using Zebra are switching to Quagga.

See also

List of open source routing platforms

References

External links
 Official website
 

Free routing software
Zebra